Trailliaedoxa is a monotypic genus of flowering plants in the family Rubiaceae. The genus contains only one species, viz. Trailliaedoxa gracilis, which is endemic to south-central China. It is also the only species in the tribe Trailliaedoxeae.

References

External links
Trailliaedoxa in the World Checklist of Rubiaceae

Ixoroideae
Monotypic Rubiaceae genera